The 1936 George Washington Colonials football team was an American football team that represented George Washington University as an independent during the 1936 college football season. In its eighth season under head coach Jim Pixlee, the team compiled a 7–1–1 record and outscored opponents by a total of 175 to 38. The team defeated Arkansas, Wake Forest, and West Virginia, tied with Ole Miss, and lost to Rice.

Schedule

References

George Washington
George Washington Colonials football seasons
George Washington Colonials football